Ngamiland West is one of the subdistricts of Ngamiland District of Botswana.

Villages 

Beetsha
Chukumuchu
Eretsha
Etsha 1
Etsha 13
Etsha 6
Gani
Gonutsuga
Gudingwa
Gumare
Ikoga
Kajaja
Kauxwhi
Mogomotho
Mohembo East
Mohembo West
Mokgacha
Ngarange
Nokaneng
Nxamasere
Nxaunxau
Qangwa
Samochema
Sekondomboro
Sepopa
Seronga
Shakawe
Tobere
Tubu
Xakao
Xaxa
Xhauga

Localities 

Animal Health & Production C
B D F Camp
Badiba
Baku
Bate
Beetsha
Beetsha Lands
Boajankwe
Bodumatau
Bolatswanamane
Botshabelo
Ceba
Chiki
Chombona
Chukumuchu Vet Camp
Congo
Danga
Dikgakana
Dineha
Dineva
Dirurubele
Ditjao
Ditlou
Divitama
Dobe
Dobe Boarder gate
Dobe Vet Camp
Dobechaa
Dungu
Easy Link Farm
Elephant
Etsha No 10
Etsha No 11
Etsha No 12
Etsha No 2
Etsha No 3
Etsha No 4
Etsha No 5
Etsha No 7
Etsha No 8
Etsha No 9
Fire Fighting Camp
Fishing Camp
Garukwi
Ghanichaochao
Gildenhuys
Gombo
Gonitsuga
Gowe
Grecha Lands
Gucha
Guda
Ikoga gate
Ipope
Jaganxo
James BDF Camp
Jororo
Juiree
Kachirachira
Kadangasa
Kadwi
Kaepe
Kajaja
Kajaja 1
Kajaja 2
Kajaja Lands
Kamburu
Kanana
Kanyamokura
Kapotora Lands
Kapotora Veterinary Camp
Karui
Katalangoti
Katlapa
Katu
Kawaronga
Kawoyo
Kgomokgwana
Kgomokgwana Vet Camp
Kihabe MTB Mining
Kiho 85 Vet Camp
Kilo 40
Kilo 60
Kobokuboga
Kogobiye
Krokovango croc farm
Kubuga
Kuringama
Kwando 1
Kwando 2
Kwaronga
Kwaxiana
Lagoon Camp
Lebala Camp
Lejao
Lobala
Maano
Magopa
Mahito
Mahorameno
Majwana
Malatsong
Mangawe
Manyondo
Mapororo a ga Kayombo
Maronga Gate 1
Maronga II
Mathabanelo
Matswee
Mbiroba
Metsiakogodimo
Metsimatala
Mmadikgabo
Moaha
Moana
Modia
Mogotlho
Moiyagogo
Mokgalo
Mokolwane
Mokwelekgele
Moporota
Morambajiwa
Motswere
Mowana
Mowana
Nakana
Ndangu
Ndorotsha
Ndorotsha Lands
Nende
Ngaracha
Ngarangobe
Ngurungome
Njou
Njou
Njova
Njovo
Nxabeqau
Nxadao
Nxamazana
Nxaunxau
Nxauxau
Nxiniga
Nxlomosabodi
Nxomokao
Nxonicha
Nxwee
Nxweree
Obare
Okavango Game Farming
Okhutse
Omojiri
Palamaokue
Palamaokuwe
Pampiri
Phatayanare
Phatswa
Polamosege
Qoboga
Rekonda
Rekonga BDF Camp
Road Camp Gucha
Roads Camp
Roads Mainteinance Camp
Romaso
Roye
Rural Roads Camp
Saikarangwe
Samoho
Samorwa
Samoti
Samoxuma
Sechenje
Sekandoko/Shandokwe/Bana
Sekondomboro
Semotsoka
Senono
Seronga BDF Base Camp
Sesagarapa
Sesatire
Seshokora
Setoto
Shadinota
Shakanjara
Shamagwagwa
Shamathu
Shaowe
Shongweshongo
Somogwe
Tamboravati Camp
Tamochaa Vet Camp
Taudumo Gate
Teekae
Thabuku
Thale
Thamache
Thinxo
Tjaakwe Gate
Tjaakwe Vet Gate
Tjikumutju\Chukumuchu
Tjiperengo
Tlama
Tobere 3
Tobere 4
Tobere Lands
Tsaa
Tshwanda (Xawache)
Tsodilo Hills
Tsokong
Tsutsuruka
Tuponguta
Upanda
Vet Camp A1
Wao
Wao
Xabache
Xabe
Xamocha
Xamoga
Xamukucha
Xaodumo
Xaree
Xarobe
Xaweche
Xaxana
Xcacha
Xhaba
Xhademoxhao
Xhanxago
Xhaoga
Xhau
Xhauga Lands
Xheo
Xhoroma Veterinary Camp
Xhowi
Xhwiihaba Vet Camp
Xinigoba
Xokwedau
Xoro
Xoshe
Xowa
Xube
Xurube
Xwexwe
Xwima
Yamoxereku
Zambia (località del Botswana)
Zanibe I
Zao
Zaza
Zeneva II

References 

North-West District (Botswana)
Populated places in Botswana